Grzegorz Stec (born January 24, 1955, Kraków, Poland) is a Polish painter, graphic artist and poet.

Biography
Stec studied 1976-1981 at the Jan Matejko Academy of Fine Arts graphics under Professor Włodzimierz Kunz and painting under Professor Jan Świderski. Stec had over 50 solo exhibitions, including the United States, Sweden, Germany and France. From 1996 to 2002 he was Artist in Residence at the Society for Arts Chicago (Exhibitions: “Letters to the Masters” (1996), "Exodus or Carnival?" (1997) und "Aqueducts of Dream" (1998)). From 2008 to 2009 retrospectives in Kraków - Pałac Sztuki (2012), in "Solvay" Centrum Sztuki Współczesnej [Centre for Contemporary Art] (2014), at the Judaica Foundation – Center For Jewish Culture  Kraków (2014). His large-scale paintings come work as a book illustrator and poster artist. About the work of Grzegorz Stec Polish television filmed the movie Zadręcza mnie zapach Czerni (1991, directed by Cezary Nowicki). Stec introduced in Germany at the Polish Institute Leipzig (2014) and in the gallery Abakus (Berlin Weissensee 2015). His poems were translated into German by Dieter Kalka. The art critic Marek Sołtysik about Stec: "He is a prophet, a prophet of the apocalypse." (2011). "Only few artists can boast of such mature craft. In the case of Master Stec it is a recognized once and for all through the autumn Atelier 2014 ". He is married to the Polish literary historian Gabriela Matuszek und lives in Krakau.

Work

Individual exhibitions (selection) 
 Klub Olimp, Krakau, 1979
 Galeria Mały Rynek, Krakau. 1985 
 Emigrant's Club, Stockholm, Sweden, 1986 
 Galeria Inny Świat, Krakau, 1986
 Teatr Stary, Krakau, 1987
 Galeria Inny Świat, Krakau, 1988
 Galeria Inny Świat, Krakau, 1989 
 Muzeum Śląskie, Katowice, 1989 
 Stara Galeria, Krakau, 1991 
 Galeria Profil, Poznań, 1992
 Teatr Witkacego, Zakopane, 1992
 Stara Galeria, Krakau, 1993
 Galeria Inny Świat, Krakau, 1993
 PAAS Gallery, New York, 1995
 Dom Natana Spiry, Krakau, 1995
 Insights, The John G. Blank Center for the Art, Michigan City (with works of Adam Fedorowicz), 1996
 Letters to the Mastres, 1112 Gallery, The Society for Arts, Chicago,1996
 Exodus or Carnival?, 1112 Gallery, The Society for Arts, Chicago, 1997
 Aqueducts of Dream, 1112 Gallery, The Society for Arts, Chicago, 1998
 Galeria Centrum, Nowohuckie Centrum Kultury Krakau, 2002
 Muzeum Historii Miasta Łodzi, Łódź, 2005
 Akwedukty snów, Galeria Ermitaż, Muzeum Łazienki Królewskie, Warsaw, 2006
 Galleri Mitteleuropa, Stockholm, 2007
 Galeria Kuriera Plus, New York, 2008
 Polnisches Generalkonsulat New York City, 2008
 Fundacja Kościuszkowska, New York, 2009
 Oto - patrz Fryderyku (with Krzysztof Izdebsk-Cruz and Marcin Kołpanowicz), Polska Filharmonia Bałtycka oraz Galeria Klucznik, 2010
 Centrum Sztuki Współczesnej, Kołobrzeg (with Marcin Kołpanowicz), 2010
 Pisane światłem, pisane mrokiem, Centrum Kultury Żydowskiej, Krakau, 2011
 Ciemne epifanie, Pałac Sztuki Towarzystwa Przyjaciół Sztuk Pięknych w Krakowie, 2012
 Jest czerń tak przezroczysta..., Galeria Ars Nova in Łodz, 2012
 Collegium Novum Uniwersytetu Jagiellońskiego, Krakau, 2013
 Mairie de Saint-Ouen Marchefroy, France, 2013
 POSTkarnawał, Dwór Czeczów, Krakau, 2013
 W świetle, w ciemności, Centrum Kultury Żydowskiej/Jiddish Culture Centre, Krakau, 2014
 Wokół Antygony, Centrum Sztuki Współczesnej Solvay, Krakau, 2014
 In Licht und Finsternis, Polish Institut Leipzig, 2014
 Melancholia i Maskarada II, Galeria Sztuki Współczesnej DAGMA ART, Katowice, 2015
 Wokół masek i demonów, Jama Michalika, Krakau, 2015
 Melancholie und Maskerade, Galerie Abakus, Berlin (together with Polish Embassy and Polnish Culture Institut Berlin), 2015
 Wóz krzyku, Pałac Sztuki, Krakau, 2015

Poetry
 Nikt tu nie szuka odpowiedzi, Kraków 1999 
 Melencolia, Kraków 2007

Bibliography (selection) 
 Marek Sołtysik, Na szlaku mocnych wystaw, „Kraków“ 2015 Nr 1, S. 92.
 Spontaniczność, precyzja i energia światła. Z Grzegorzem Stecem rozmawia Michalina Domoń, „Artysta i Sztuka“ 2013 Nr 9, S. 80-91.
 Marek Sołtysik, Światło, które odgania sępy, „Kraków” Nr 3, S. 93.
 Wojciech Ligęza, Cztery sale: korowód, „Kraków” Nr 3, S. 92.
 Beata Anna Symołon, Niezbędny jest tylko czas…, 
 Marek Sołtysik, Światło, które odgania sępy „Kraków” 2011 Nr 11-12 (November/Dezember), S. 93.
 Gabriela Matuszek, Akwedukty intrygujących metafor. O malarstwie Grzegorza Steca, „Kraków” „Kraków” 2010 Nr 4.
 Izabela Joanna Bożek, Zagadka, żywioł i poezja, „Kurier Plus” New York, 10. Mai 2008
 Czesław Karkowski, „Efektowne obraz Grzegorza Steca”, „Przegląd Polski”, New York, 9. Mai 2008
 Tadeusz Nyczek, Katalog wystawy Grzegorz Stec, Akwedukty snów / Aqueducts of Dreams, Muzeum Łazienki Królewskim w Warszawie, Galeria Ermitaż, 2006
 Marcin Kołpanowicz, Grzegorz Stec, jest czerń… Katalog wystawy w Galerii Centrum, Kraków 2002.
 Anna Bugajska, Historie z wyobraźni. Wystawa malarstwa Grzegorza Steca, „Gazeta Wyborcza” Kraków, 24. Mai 2002
 Marcin Kołpanowicz, Katalog wystawy w Galerii Centrum w Krakowie, 2002
 Ewa Krasoń, „Akwedukty snu, nowe obrazy Grzegorza Steca w Galerii Towarzystwa Sztuki”, „Monitor”, dodatek kulturalny do „Dziennika Związkowego:, Chicago, January 1999
 Wanda Pietrzyk-Małysa, „Exodus czy karnawał? Panoramiczne malarstwo Grzegorza Steca”
 „Kalejdoskop Tygodnia”, Magazyn Kulturalny „Dziennika Związkowego”, Chicago, 22. Mai 1997 (Nr 20)
 Ewa Krasoń, Malarstwo i poezja Grzegorza Steca, „Kalejdoskop Tygodnia”, Magazyn Kulturalny „Dziennika Związkowego”, Chicago, 31. Mai 1996 (Nr 5).
 Grzegorz Niziołek, Katalog wystawy w Galerii Jatki, Nowy Targ, 1992
 Tadeusz Nyczek, Program Galerii „Inny Świat”, July 1988
 Marta Fita, Program Galerii „Inny Świat”, July 1988
 Maciej Szybist, „Kuszenie św. Mahlera”, Program wystawy w Teatrze Starym, Kraków, April 1987
 Roman Świątek, Program wystawy w Teatrze Starym, Kraków, April 1987
 Tadeusz Nyczek, Katalog wystawy w Galerii Mały Rynek, Kraków 1985

References

External links
 Website of the artist
 Elzbieta Wojnarowska, interview with Grzegorz Stec, movie
 critic about G. Stec
 Beata Anna Symołon about Stec
 Interview 2015, Radio Krakau

Polish poets
Artists from Kraków
Living people
1955 births
20th-century Polish painters
20th-century Polish male artists
20th-century Polish writers
Polish male painters